Golden Ring is a Russian folk-pop group, founded 1988 in Moscow by Alexander Kostyuk and Nadezhda Kadysheva. The name of the group refers to the Golden Ring of Russia.

External links
 Official webpage
 Official webpage on MySpace
 

Russian folk music groups
Soviet musical groups
Musical groups established in 1988
Russian musical groups
Winners of the Golden Gramophone Award